Ricardo Velarde (born 5 June 1954) is a Mexican diver. He competed in the men's 10 metre platform event at the 1976 Summer Olympics.

References

1954 births
Living people
Mexican male divers
Olympic divers of Mexico
Divers at the 1976 Summer Olympics
Place of birth missing (living people)